Kumar Sanu is an Indian playback singer, working primarily in Hindi films, he also sings in many other Indian languages, including English, Marathi, Assamese, Bhojpuri, Gujarati, Telugu, Malayalam, Kannada, Tamil, Punjabi, Oriya, Chhattisgarhi, Urdu, Pali, and his native language, Bengali. He has sung a total of 1,723 songs in Hindi films. The following is a complete list of his Hindi film songs:

1980s

1989

1990s

1990

1991

1992

1993

1994

1995

1996

1997

1998

1999

2000s

2000

2001

2002

2003

2004

2005

2006

2007-2009

2010s

2020s

See also
List of Hindi songs recorded by Udit Narayan
Bollywood selected discography of Udit Narayan
Abhijeet Bhattacharya Discography
Sonu Nigam discography
List of songs recorded by Amit Kumar
List of songs recorded by Kishore Kumar

References

Discographies of Indian artists
Sanu, Kumar